Mauro Laspada (born January 9, 1975 in Punta Alta) was an Argentine football defender who is currently the coach of Olimpo de Bahía Blanca.

Notes

External links
 Web NO OFICIAL de Mauro Laspada
 Clausura 2003 statistics at Terra.com.ar 
 Apertura 2003 statistics at Terra.com.ar 
 Clausura 2004 statistics at Terra.com.ar 
 Apertura 2004 statistics at Terra.com.ar 
 Apertura 2005 statistics at Terra.com.ar 

1975 births
Living people
Association football defenders
Argentine footballers
Unión de Santa Fe footballers
Olimpo footballers
Club Atlético Tigre footballers
Atlético de Rafaela footballers
Godoy Cruz Antonio Tomba footballers
Sportspeople from Buenos Aires Province
Association football midfielders